Tim O'Brien (born June 13, 1968) is an American politician who served as an elected official in Connecticut in different positions from 1997 to 2013. He was most recently Mayor of New Britain, Connecticut, serving from 2011 to 2013. From 2003 to 2011, O'Brien was a member of the Connecticut House of Representatives and represented the 24th Assembly District, which includes parts of New Britain and Newington, Connecticut. From 1997 to 2003, O'Brien was a member of the New Britain City Council.

References

1968 births
Living people
Democratic Party members of the Connecticut House of Representatives
Mayors of New Britain, Connecticut